Sebastião de Herédia (20 March 1903 – 2 February 1983) was a Portuguese modern pentathlete. He competed at the 1928 and 1932 Summer Olympics.

References

External links
 

1903 births
1983 deaths
Portuguese male modern pentathletes
Olympic modern pentathletes of Portugal
Modern pentathletes at the 1928 Summer Olympics
Modern pentathletes at the 1932 Summer Olympics
Sportspeople from Lisbon